The Department of Infrastructure and Industrial Development, also known as Infrastructure and Industrial Development Department, and often abbreviated IIDD is a department of the Government of Uttar Pradesh. The department was established to create an enabling environment for industrial growth in Uttar Pradesh. It was reconstituted in 2007, after the Government of Uttar Pradesh merged the Department of Industrial Development with the newly-created Department of Infrastructure. The department is responsibility of a cabinet minister of the Uttar Pradesh government, but, its administration is headed by the Infrastructure and Industrial Development Commissioner of Uttar Pradesh, who is an Indian Administrative Service (IAS) officer.

Functions 
The Department serves as a facilitator of Infrastructure development in the state of Uttar Pradesh. The department and its attached organisations develop buildings, expressways and other infrastructure to attract investors to the state of Uttar Pradesh.

Udyog Bandhu 
Udyog Bandhu is a registered society set-up by the Uttar Pradesh government to help entrepreneurs who want to invest in the state. It's headed by the state's chief minister. But the daily affairs of the organisation are handled by its chairperson and its executive director, both of whom are IAS officer. The current chairperson of Udyog Bandhu is Anup Chandra Pandey, who also serves as the chief secretary of Uttar Pradesh and the Infrastructure and Industrial Development Commissioner of Uttar Pradesh, whereas, its current executive director of Udyog Bandhu is Santosh Kumar Yadav.

On the divisional level, Udyog Bandhu meetings are chaired by the divisional commissioner of that division, whilst on the district level, Udyog Bandhu meetings are chaired by the district magistrate and collector of that district.

Sections in the Department of Infrastructure and Industrial Development 
There are six sections in IIDD, namely Section-1, Section-2, Section-3, Section-4, Section-5, and Section-6, each dealing with matters allotted to it.

Important officials

Departmental level 
Satish Mahana, serves as the departmental minister, and Suresh Rana serves as the Minister of State for Infrastructure and Industrial Development.

The administration of department is normally headed by the principal secretary responsible for it, who is an IAS officer. The principal secretary is assisted by two secretaries, four special secretaries and three joint, deputy or under secretaries. The current principal secretary is Rajesh Kumar Singh.

Presently, the chief secretary of Uttar Pradesh serves as the administrative head of the Department Infrastructure and Industrial Development as the Infrastructure and Industrial Development Commissioner. The current chief secretary is Anup Chandra Pandey.

Autonomous, attached and subordinate bodies 
The department has attached to it numerous undertakings of the Government of Uttar Pradesh, excluding NOIDA Authority, Greater NOIDA Authority, Yamuna Expressway Authority, the Uttar Pradesh Expressways Industrial Development Authority and the Uttar Pradesh State Industrial Development Corporation. The department has also attached to it a registered society in Udyog Bandhu.

References

External links 
 

Government agencies established in 2007
2007 establishments in Uttar Pradesh
Infrastructure and Industrial Development
Uttar Pradesh